Jorma Taipale (born 15 May 1949) is a Finnish boxer. He competed in the men's middleweight event at the 1976 Summer Olympics. At the 1976 Summer Olympics, he lost to Rufat Riskiyev of the Soviet Union.

References

1949 births
Living people
Finnish male boxers
Olympic boxers of Finland
Boxers at the 1976 Summer Olympics
Sportspeople from Helsinki
Middleweight boxers